Umpire High School is a public high school located in Umpire, Arkansas, United States. The school provides secondary education in grades 7 through 12 serving rural, distant communities of Howard County, Arkansas. It is one of four public high schools in Howard County and one of two high schools administered by the Cossatot River School District.

It was initially a part of the Umpire School District. On July 1, 2004, the former Umpire district was consolidated into the Wickes School District. On July 1, 2010, that district consolidated into the Cossatot River School District.

Academics 
The assumed course of study follows the Smart Core curriculum developed by the Arkansas Department of Education (ADE), which requires students complete at least 22 units prior to graduation. Students complete regular coursework and exams and may take Advanced Placement (AP) courses and exam with the opportunity to receive college credit. Umpire High School is accredited by the ADE.

Athletics 
The Umpire High School mascot and athletic emblem is the Wildcat, with blue and white serving as the school colors.

The Umpire Wildcats compete in interscholastic activities within the 1A Classification, the state's smallest classification administered by the Arkansas Activities Association. The Wildcats play within the 1A Region 7 West Conference.

The Wildcats participate in basketball (boys/girls) and baseball.

References

External links 
 

Public high schools in Arkansas
Public middle schools in Arkansas
Schools in Howard County, Arkansas